Paramicrodon is a genus of hoverflies, with eight known species. They differ from Microdon by their short antennae and the lack of appendices on vein R4+5.

Biology
Larvae are found in ant nests.

Distribution
They are native to Oriental, Australian, and Neotropical regions.

Species
P. cinctellus (Sack, 1926)
P. delicatulus Hull, 1937
P. flukei Curran, 1936
P. lorentzi Meijere, 1913
P. miranda (Herve-Bazin, 1926)
P. nigripennis (Sack, 1922)
P. novus Hull, 1937
P. toxopei Meijere, 1929

References

Hoverfly genera
Microdontinae
Diptera of Australasia
Diptera of Asia